The Tamil Nadu Prevention of Dangerous Activities of Bootleggers, Drug Offenders, Goondas, Immoral Traffic Offenders, Forest Offenders, Sand Offenders, Slum-Grabbers and Video Pirates Act, 1982, popularly known as the Goondas Act in Tamil Nadu, India and Gundar Sattam in Tamil, is a law for habitual offenders to be detained for a year as a preventive measure.

The act was later amended to include, forest offenders, sand smugglers, cyber criminals and sexual offenders against women. The amended act allows the state to also hold first-time offenders for an offence that may have a potential to disrupt public order.

Overview 
The act allows for the imprisonment of certain categories of criminals whose actions have the potential to disrupt public order, and it can be used against repeat offenders. The primary requirement for issuing a detention order under the Act in respect of 'goonda' is repeated conduct, attempt to commit, or abetment of commission of offenses listed in the description of the term "goonda". 

The authorities can imprison someone under this act. This act is enforced by the Commissioner of Police in metropolitan areas and the District Collector in rural regions. A person can be arrested under sections 16, 17, 22, 45 of the Indian Penal Code only if they are believed of committing a crime or are a member of a criminal organization. An advisory panel consisting of judges will decide whether the arrest is correct. Even after the panel made a decision, a person can approach the High Court and seek relief. The offender may face up to 12 months in prison if the Goondas act is decided on him. If the state administration so wishes, he can be released ahead of time. If a person is arrested under this Act and is released with certain conditions and if he/she violates the conditions, he/she will be sentenced to up to two years in prison.

If a person arrested under this Act wishes to show that he innocence, his lawyer cannot advocate on his behalf. Only members of his family may approach the appeals panel on his behalf. Once a person is detained, his or her family has 12 days to request for his or her release, first to the state for evaluation, then to the advisory panel established under Section 10 of the Act. The panel will be made up of a High Court judge, a retired judge, and a session judge. The panel will conduct an investigation and report to the court on whether the act imposed on the person concerned is right. Action will be taken against the person based on the decision. 

According to the state, the amended act allows the state to also hold first-time offenders for an offence that may have a potential to disrupt public order. The government based its decision on a 2011 Madras High Court judgement that said that "even a single crime allows imprisonment of a person as a Goonda, under the Act.

History 
The Act was enacted during the administration of former Chief Minister M. G. Ramachandran (MGR). He intended to enact a strict law to prosecute and punish anyone who unlawfully produce, sell, disrupt public order, instigate violence, or indulge in smuggling and embezzlement. After consultations with government officials, ministers and others, MGR came up with a law. The complete name of the act is the Prevention of Dangerous Activities of Bootleggers, Drug Offenders, Goondas, Immoral Traffic Offenders, Forest Offenders, Sand Offenders, Slum-Grabbers and Video Pirates Act. In short it was known as the Prevention of Violence Act'. The law is called the "Goondas Act", by simply calling the perpetrators as "Goondas".

Forest offenders 
In 1988, the term “forest offenders” was included to defined to cover the individuals who were involved in the destruction of the environment.

Video pirates 
In 2004 under the Jayalalithaa government, the term "video pirates" was amended to include individuals who commits, tries to commit, or aids and abets the commission of copyright infringement offences in connection to a cinematograph film or a record incorporating any part of the sound track connected with the movie to be punishable under the Copyright Act, 1957; the theft and sale of films on compact discs (CDs) was brought under the Act.

Sand offenders 
In 2006, the “Sand offenders” was amended by the Dravida Munnetra Kazhagam government to include criminal syndicates in the sand-supply business.

Cyber criminals and sexual offenders 
The administration introduced two bills on August 11, 2014 to put cyber criminals and sexual offenders against women under the Act. Individuals who are “preparing to publish offensive content that threaten public order on any social media,” and those who commit offences specified in Chapter XI of the Information Technology Act, 2000, can be held under the Act by the state police. In July 2019, the Act was amended to cover sexual offences and cyber crimes.

See also 

 Puducherry Prevention of Anti-Social Activities Act

References

Bibliography 

Tamil Nadu state legislation
Acts related to organized crime
Law of India
Crime in Tamil Nadu
Indian intellectual property law